Wrestling International New Generations (W*ING) was a Japanese professional wrestling promotion specialized in deathmatches.

History
After leaving Frontier Martial-Arts Wrestling in the summer of 1991, Kazuyoshi Osako and Kiyoshi "Mickey" Ibaragi founded Wrestling International New Generations (W*ING), with Osako as President and Ibaragi as Vice President. They would also lure away Mr. Pogo and Víctor Quiñones from FMW, taking away their number one heel and booker/talent exchanger.

Their first show took place on August 7, 1991, at the Korakuen Hall in Tokyo. W*ING would also have a talent exchange relationship with Puerto Rico-based World Wrestling Council, as well as sharing WWC's Caribbean Heavyweight and World Junior Heavyweight Championships between the two promotions. On March 21, 1994, W*ING closed due to the massive loss of money. Quinones would later form International Wrestling Association of Japan later that year.

After W*ING
In 1994, former W*ING wrestlers Mr. Pogo, Mitsuhiro Matsunaga, Hideki Hosaka and Yukihiro Kanemura joined FMW and formed a W*ING Alliance, which had the motive of ending FMW as they held Atsushi Onita and his FMW responsible for ending W*ING. The W*ING storyline carried on for three years before the stable was forced to disband on September 28, 1997.

Since 1995, Ibaragi has held several one-off W*ING reunion shows until 2010.

Mr. Pogo formed an offshoot promotion in 2001 called World W*ING Spirit (WWS), which would last until his death on June 23, 2017.

Notable W*ING alumni

Natives
Mr. Pogo
Yukihiro Kanemura/W*ING Kanemura
Masayoshi Motegi
Ryo Miyake
Jado
Gedo
Hiroshi Ono
Akitoshi Saito
Koichiro Kimura
Hideki Hosaka
Kim Duk
Kendo Nagasaki
Etsuko Mita
Manami Toyota
Shizuka Minami
Yumiko Hotta
Aja Kong
Akira Hokuto
Kyoko Inoue
The Great Sasuke
Shunji Takano
Super Delfin
Taka Michinoku
Terry Boy

Gaijin

United States
Crash The Terminator
Leatherface
Freddy Kruger/Nightmare Freddie/Doug Gilbert
Boogie Man/Eddie Gilbert
The Headhunters
Super Invader
New Jason The Terrible
Dick Murdoch
Masked Superstar
Wahoo McDaniel
The Grappler #2
Gypsy Joe
Kevin Sullivan
Giant Kimala
Tom Prichard
The Moondogs (Spot and Splat)
Jimmy Backlund
The Great Wojo
The Texas Hangmen (Killer and Psycho)
Scotty The Body
Danny Davis
Eric Embry
Cheetah Kid
Rip Rogers
Rochester Roadblock
Samoan Warrior
Tazmaniac
Vic Steamboat
Bart Sawyer
Brett Sawyer
Killer Kyle
The Bruise Brothers

Canada
Bash The Terminator
Ivan Koloff
Goliath El Gigante
Iron Horse/Leatherface II

Mexico
Mil Mascaras
El Canek
Dos Caras
Zuleyma
Martha Villalobos
Fishman
Super Muneco
Super Raton
Tinieblas
Tinieblas, Jr.
El Gran Sheik
Arkangel de la Muerte
Dr. Wagner, Jr.
El Texano
Francisco Flores
Hopper King
Miss Janeth
Mascara Magica
Silver King

Puerto Rico
Jason The Terrible
TNT
The Iceman
Miguel Perez, Jr.
Carlos Jose Estrada/Super Medic I
Víctor Quiñones (manager)
Ray González
The Crypt Keeper
Cuban Assassin
Huracan Castillo, Jr.
Invader I
Invader II
Richie Santiago (El Boricua)

United Kingdom
Pete Collins
Bill Collins

Australia
Bill Dundee

Africa
Steve Simpson

Championships

Championships exclusive to W*ING
W*ING World Heavyweight Championship
W*ING World Tag Team Championship

Championships shared between W*ING and WWC
W*ING/WWC Caribbean Heavyweight Championship
W*ING/WWC World Junior Heavyweight Championship

See also

Professional wrestling in Japan

References

External links

Japanese professional wrestling promotions
Organizations established in 1991
Organizations disestablished in 1994
1991 establishments in Japan
1994 disestablishments in Japan